James Southerton (16 November 1827 – 16 June 1880) was a professional cricketer who played first-class cricket between 1854 and 1879. After a slow start, he became, along with Alfred Shaw, the greatest slow bowler of the 1870s. He played in the first Test match and remains the oldest player to make their debut in Test cricket.

Early career
Southerton began his cricketing life during the 1850s as a batsman for Sussex. In 1861, Southerton was engaged at Southampton and resided at the Antelope Ground until 1867. During this period Southerton, operating in a period before regulations prevented anyone playing for more than one county in the same season, played for both Sussex and Hampshire.

It was not until 1865 that Southerton developed the slow bowling for which he was to gain belated fame and set many records. At a time when bowling was mainly fast round-arm, Southerton's slower speed with its deceptive flight and sharp break was a challenge for batsmen that they did not adapt to easily. Southerton had much more than spin and flight, however. He was able to vary his pace and pitch very well, often deceiving batsmen by bowling a ball outside the off stump which turned on the under-prepared pitches of his time viciously into the right-handed batsmen. Southerton typically would then bowl a faster, straighter ball as a contrast, and was exceptionally strong at knowing which ball would be most difficult for each individual batsman. Like Lancashire's Alec Watson, who was often called "the Southerton of the North", the fairness of Southerton's delivery was sometimes called into question.

Upon leaving Southampton, Southerton played for Surrey as well as Sussex and Hampshire, and with more cricket to play because of Surrey's longer programme, became the most successful bowler in England. Playing only for Surrey and Sussex in 1868, Southerton was the leading wicket-taker in England with 151 wickets, aided by an exceptionally hot summer and very bad pitches even for the era. Two years later Southerton became the first bowler to reach 200 wickets in a first-class season, and played in as many as twenty-seven of only forty-nine first-class matches played during the year. During this period it was said that Southerton was the one bowler able to defeat or even contain the brilliant batting of W. G. Grace. He continued as a leading bowler between 1871 and 1875, including taking 16 wickets for 52 runs in a day for the South against the North on a sticky wicket on 17 May 1875.

Test debut and later career

Although Southerton declined somewhat in the 1876 season with 28 fewer wickets than the previous year, he toured Australia as part of James Lillywhite's side the following winter. This led to him playing in the first-ever Test matches. Southerton was 49 years 119 days old when he made his Test debut, making him the oldest ever Test debutant. Southerton made his Test debut on 15 March 1877, breaking the dominant partnership of Charles Bannerman and Bransby Cooper.

Age was clearly catching up with Southerton, and the following season saw him fail to reach 100 first-class wickets for the first time since 1866. He played his final matches in 1879 and became the first Test cricketer to die when he succumbed after a short attack of pleurisy just ten months after he had retired from cricket.

Outside of cricket, Southerton was the landlord of the Cricketers Hotel at Mitcham Cricket Green, southwest London.

Bibliography
Gault, Adrian. James Southerton: The Man of Many Counties. London: Mitcham Cricket Club, 2020.

References

External links

1827 births
1880 deaths
England Test cricketers
English cricketers
Hampshire cricketers
Surrey cricketers
Sussex cricketers
Players cricketers
North v South cricketers
United South of England Eleven cricketers
People from Petworth
Surrey Club cricketers
Married v Single cricketers
Players of the South cricketers
New All England Eleven cricketers